Sightings are the visual detection of new things.

Sightings may also refer to:

 Sightings (TV series), an American television series
 Sightings (band), an American noise rock music group

See also

 Sight (disambiguation)